Haddenham may refer to:
Haddenham, Buckinghamshire, a village in England
Haddenham Junior School
Haddenham St Mary's Church of England School
Haddenham and Thame Parkway railway station
Haddenham (Bucks) railway station, a former station in Buckinghamshire, England
Haddenham, Cambridgeshire, a village in England
Haddenham railway station, a former station in Cambridgeshire, England